

Medal count